Nae-Simion Pleşca (born 13 September 1955 or 1957) is a politician from Moldova. He has been a member of the Parliament of Moldova since 2010.

References

External links 
 SIMION PLEŞCA
 Parlamentul Republicii Moldova

1955 births
1957 births
Living people
Liberal Democratic Party of Moldova MPs
Moldovan MPs 2010–2014
Moldovan philologists